From 1968 to 2012 at least 839 teacher strikes have occurred in the US. 740 of these have been in Pennsylvania. Teacher strikes and walkouts have since increased in popularity outside of Pennsylvania due to the Red for Ed movement in 2018-19.

History 
The 1919 Boston police strike chilled union interest in the public sector in the 1920s. The major exception was the emergence of unions of public school teachers in the largest cities; they formed the American Federation of Teachers (AFT), affiliated with the AFL. In suburbs and small cities, the National Education Association (NEA) became active, but it insisted it was not a labor union but a professional organization.

Legality 
The legality of teacher strikes vary from state to state. Collective bargaining by public sector employees and therefore teachers is explicitly illegal in Georgia, North Carolina, South Carolina, Texas, and Virginia. 12 states have explicitly stated that teacher strikes are legal. These states are Alaska, California, Colorado, Hawaii, Illinois, Louisiana, Minnesota, Montana, Ohio, Oregon, Pennsylvania, and Vermont. South Carolina, Utah, and Wyoming have no explicit statutes or case law on the subject.

In states that explicitly ban strikes, teachers have employed alternative tactics, such as walkouts and sick-outs where the majority of teachers call in sick on the same day.

2018-2019 Education Workers' Strike Movement (Red for Ed) 

In February 2018, the US saw an education protest and strike movement, which began in West Virginia. Statewide, Oklahoma, Colorado, and Arizona followed suit. Demands varied from state to state but included funding sources for education, pension issues, increased pay.

Strikes by State

Colorado 
Despite being explicitly allowed, Colorado had no teacher's strikes between 1994 and 2018. Pueblo Education Association went on strike May 2, 2018 asking for a 2% raise and $30 per a month for health insurance. The Denver Classroom Teachers Association, the largest teachers union in the state, went on strike in February of 2019 over low pay, and issues around an unpredictable and unjust compensation model.

Illinois 

A strike of Chicago Public School teachers that occurred in 2019 was significant enough to garner support from national politicians.

Illinois holds the record for the longest teachers' strike to date. This was an eight month strike beginning in October 1986 in Homer, IL. After roughly one month, the school board hired strike breaking substitutes for much of the school year.

Ohio 
Ohio holds the record for the second longest teachers' strike, which lasted for 85 days in 1981.

Pennsylvania 
Pennsylvania explicitly allows teachers to strike. However, since 1992 state act 88 gives the Pennsylvania Department of Education the power to order teachers to return to work to ensure that students still receive 180 days of instruction. This has subsequently reduced the frequency of teacher strikes in Pennsylvania, although the state still leads the nation in strikes. Between 2000 and 2007, Pennsylvania accounted for 60% of teacher strikes nationwide. 2010 saw 3 strikes, while 2011 had one strike. Between 1968 and 2012 Pennsylvania has had 740 teacher strikes. A major cause of strikes in Pennsylvania is that contracts are frequently allowed to lapse for several years before the school board and teachers union can come to a new agreement.

West Virginia 
The West Virginia statewide educator walkout in 2018 began the Red for Ed movement.

References 

Education labor disputes in the United States